Plaza Carolina is an enclosed shopping mall located in Carolina, Puerto Rico. Anchored by JCPenney, TJ Maxx, Caribbean Cinemas, Burlington and Forever 21, it features 161 stores, making it the second largest mall in Puerto Rico and the Caribbean. It also has a food court in its second floor and several offices in its third floor.

History

Starting development as early as 1972 and being scheduled for completion by 1976, it was estimated to generate at least $75 million dollars in retail sales annually during its first 3 years of operation and over $100 million thereafter. The mall finally opened in 1978, with more than 100 stores, 3 anchor stores, and parking for 5,000 cars. Its 3 main anchor stores at the time were, Sears, JCPenney, and a Gonzalez Padin. Later on, also having a 36,700 sq. ft. Woolworth and a 26,379 sq. ft. Tiendas Capri.

Under the management of Compass Retail, Inc. Plaza Carolina started an extensive renovation and, said renovations were completed by 1991. The renovations gave the mall a needed facelift at the time, stripping it off its original late 70s design.

After the renovations and rebranding adapting its slogan at the time "Lo in en Shopping", the mall had 170 stores, of which were included, Walgreens, KB Toys, RadioShack, Pearle Vision, Zales, Kinney Shoes, The Gap, Marianne, Florsheim Shoes, Sam Goody, among others. At one point even having an U.A. Cinema, later shuttering for a new cinema.

In October 1995, Gonzalez Padin ceased operations after a failed buyout by the retailer Dillard's which was supposed to save the department store but for unknown reasons the deal never happened, causing the permanent closure of Gonzalez Padin. Over the passing years the former space of Gonzalez Padin was subdivided into a mall entrance, and a Forever 21.

In October 1998, under the Lend Lease Corporation an agreement was made with LaSalle Partners Incorporated to acquire from Lend Lease the Compass Retail Management and Leasing operations for an estimated $180 million dollars with provisions for an earnout payment of up to $77.5 million dollars over 5 years, of which Plaza Carolina was included.

In 1999, the mall got a $25 million expansion and renovation which added over 60,000 square feet in retail, a 12-screen CineVista Theatres, and a 510,000 square foot parking deck.

In May 2004, Simon Property Group, Inc. completed its %100 interest from LaSalle Partners Incorporated in Plaza Carolina for $309 million dollars. At the time the mall had maintained a 98% average historical occupancy rate over the last 5 years, generating total annual sales of approximately $275 million and sales per square foot of over $450.

In January 2008, the CineVista Theatres shuttered due to bankruptcy. Later in May 2017, it was announced that a new Caribbean Cinemas would be opening in Spring 2018, bringing the mall back to having a cinema. Caribbean Cinemas previously operated a movie theater at the mall from 1997 until 1998, when it closed to move to a new location in Plaza Escorial.

In Spring 2011, Simon Property Group, Inc. announced that Plaza Carolina, a major shopping destination for 33 years, would be completely renovated beginning the Spring of 2011. Said mall renovations would include new interior and exterior features and amenities such as additional seating, updated restrooms, redesigned mall entrances, landscaping, flooring, and lighting. Said renovations were completed by 2012.

In 2014, Sports Authority and Men's Wearhouse were opened.

In 2015, a new restaurant opened in the food court called La Parrilla Argentina. Also in 2015, Sears Holdings spun off 235 of its properties, including the Sears at Plaza Carolina, into Seritage Growth Properties.

In 2016, Sports Authority closed after only two years in operation due to bankruptcy.

On September 20, 2017, the mall was heavily damaged by Hurricane Maria when it struck Puerto Rico, leaving the mall in critical conditions. The mall was later repaired 

In January 2020, it was announced that Best Buy would be closing on February 28, 2020, as they decided to not renew their lease.

On December 23, 2020, it was announced that Sears would also be closing as part of a plan to close 23 stores nationwide. The store closed in February 2021.

In early 2020, DSW Designer Shoe Warehouse was closed at the mall for unknown reasons.

In 2021, a Burlington opened in the former Best Buy.

Current anchors
JCPenney
TJ Maxx
Burlington
Caribbean Cinemas 
Econo (outparcel)
Tiendas Capri                                        
Forever 21

Former anchors
Sports Authority
Best Buy
Cinevista Theatres
DSW Designer Shoe Warehouse
Gonzalez Padin
Woolworths
Sears

See also
Plaza Las Americas
The Mall of San Juan

Notes

References

1978 establishments in Puerto Rico
Carolina, Puerto Rico
Shopping malls in Puerto Rico
Simon Property Group
Shopping malls established in 1978
Economic history of Puerto Rico